Blu Blu Blu is an album by Muhal Richard Abrams released on the Italian Black Saint label in 1991 and features performances of eight of Abrams compositions by a big band. Abrams dedicated the title track on the album to Muddy Waters.

Reception
The Allmusic review by Scott Yanow calls the album "One of pianist/composer Muhal Richard Abrams' strongest big-band dates... The music occasionally glances back at the past but mostly looks forward in its own unique way. Recommended". The music writer Tom Moon includes Blu Blu Blu in his book 1,000 Recordings to Hear Before You Die, commenting that the album succeeds in creating "unpredictable music distinguished by a bustling big-city exuberance." The Penguin Guide to Jazz awarded the album 4 stars calling it "Abram's best album for some time... this is among one of the most important contemporary big band records".

Track listing 
All compositions by Muhal Richard Abrams
 "Plus Equal Minus Balance" - 11:13
 "Cycles Five" - 7:55
 "Bloodline" - 15:24
 "Septone" - 6:32
 "Blu Blu Blu" - 9:17
 "Petsrof" - 6:29
 "One for the Whistler" - 6:51
 "Stretch Time" - 13:24
 Recorded on 9 & 10 November 1990 at RPM Sound Studios, Inc., New York

Personnel 
 Jack Walrath: trumpet
 Alfred Patterson: trombone
 John Purcell: alto saxophone, flute, clarinet
 Robert De Bellis: alto saxophone, flute, bass clarinet
 Eugene Ghee: tenor saxophone, clarinet, bass clarinet
 Patience Higgins: clarinet, flute, baritone saxophone
 Mark Taylor: french horn (track 3)
 Joe Daley: tuba
 Brad Jones: bass
 Lindsey Horner: bass (tracks 2, 4 & 6)
 David Fiuczynski: guitar
 Warren Smith: vibraphone, timpani
 Joel Brandon: whistling
 Thurman Barker: drums
 Muhal Richard Abrams: piano, synthesizer, conductor

References 

1991 albums
Muhal Richard Abrams albums
Black Saint/Soul Note albums